Darreh Nikuiyeh (also Romanized as Darreh Nīkū’īyeh; also known as Darreh Nagū’īyeh) is a village in Dehsard Rural District, in the Central District of Arzuiyeh County, Kerman Province, Iran. At the 2006 census, its population was 11, in 4 families.

References 

Populated places in Arzuiyeh County